Hard Rope & Silken Twine is the twelfth and final album released by The Incredible String Band. It was released in 1974.

It was fitting that their final track "Ithkos" was 20 minutes of several compositions. These ranging from Greek roots, to their strongest genre, folk, then progressive rock, and ending with the addition of synthesizers. Such lengthy compositions were common for the band during their heyday.

Overall the album contains folk songs mixed with progressive rock influence. These attempts at changing the band's sound proved to be unsuccessful because, after disappointing sales, the band was dropped from its label. Musical differences created continuing turmoil that led to the band dissolving by October of the same year.

Track listing

References

Chart Listing
In the Bubbling Under the Top LPs list on the Billboard 200, the album topped at No. 208.

External links
 Making Time

1974 albums
The Incredible String Band albums
Island Records albums